Cliff Titus (July 6, 1890 - March 8, 1988) was an American politician from Joplin, Missouri, who served in the Missouri Senate.  During World War I, he served as a chaplain in the 14th Infantry, ranked as a first lieutenant.  In 1921, he began serving as a chaplain with the rank of captain in the Missouri National Guard.

References

1890 births
1988 deaths
United States Army chaplains
American military personnel of World War I
Republican Party Missouri state senators
20th-century American politicians
20th-century American clergy